A partial solar eclipse took place on February 15, 2018. A solar eclipse occurs when the Moon passes between Earth and the Sun, thereby totally or partly obscuring the image of the Sun for a viewer on Earth. A partial solar eclipse occurs in the polar regions of the Earth when the center of the Moon's shadow misses the Earth.

The eclipse took place before sunset in the Southern Cone of South America.

Images

Gallery

Related eclipses

Eclipses of 2018 
 A total lunar eclipse on January 31.
 A partial solar eclipse on February 15.
 A partial solar eclipse on July 13.
 A total lunar eclipse on July 27.
 A partial solar eclipse on August 11.

Solar eclipses descending node 2015-2018 

 Saros 120: Total Solar Eclipse March 20, 2015
 Saros 130: Total Solar Eclipse March 8–9, 2016
 Saros 140: Annular Solar Eclipse February 26, 2017
 Saros 150: Partial Solar Eclipse February 15, 2018

Solar eclipses 2015–2018

Saros 150 
It is a part of Saros cycle 150, repeating every 18 years, 11 days, containing 71 events. The series started with partial solar eclipse on August 24, 1729. It contains annular eclipses from April 22, 2126 through June 22, 2829. There are no total eclipses in this series. The series ends at member 71 as a partial eclipse on September 29, 2991. The longest duration of annularity will be 9 minutes, 58 seconds on December 19, 2522.
<noinclude>

Metonic series

External links 

 NASA chart
 NASA animation
 Partial Solar Eclipse of 2018 February 15
 APOD 2/20/2018

2018 2 18
2018 in science
2018 2 18
February 2018 events